Damesellidae is a family of odontopleurid trilobites found in late Middle to Late Cambrian marine strata, primarily of China.  Damesellids are closely related to the odontopleurids of Odontopleuridae, but are not nearly as spinose, nor possess spines as exaggerated as Odontopleuridae.  Like Odontopleuridae odontopleurids, damesellids have broad, bar-shaped cranidia with ledge-like borders.  Damesellidae may represent transitional forms between more primitive, possibly ancestral ptychopariids and more advanced odontopleurids.

Genera
Genera include

?Adelogonus
Bergeronites
Blackwelderia
Blackwelderioides
Chiawangella
Cyrtoprora
Damesella
Damesops
Dipentaspis
Dipyrgotes
Neodrepanura
Duamsannella
Fengduia
Guancenshania
?Hercantyx
Histiomona
Jiawangaspis
Karslanus 
Liuheaspis
Metashantungia
Neodamesella
Palaeadotes,
Paradamesella
Parashantungia
Pingquania
Pionaspis
Protaitzehoia
Pseudoblackwelderia
Shantungia
Stephanocare
Taihangshania
Taitzehoia
Teinistion
Xintaia
Yanshanopyge

References

 
Odontopleurida
Trilobite families
Furongian extinctions